Hutton Valley Township is an inactive township in Howell County, in the U.S. state of Missouri.

Hutton Valley Township takes its name from the community of Hutton Valley, Missouri.

References

Townships in Missouri
Townships in Howell County, Missouri